Minin is a Russian masculine surname, its feminine counterpart is Minina. It may refer to

 Fyodor Minin, Russian Arctic explorer
 Kuzma Minin, 17th-century Russian military commander
 Leonid Minin (born 1947), arms trafficker
 Mikhail Minin (1922–2008)), World War II Soviet soldier
 Nikita Minin, birth name of Russian Orthodox Patriarch Nikon
 Oleg V. Minin (born 1960), Russian physicist
 Vladilen F. Minin (born 1932), Soviet physicist

Russian-language surnames